Mac is a 1992 American drama film co-written and directed by John Turturro, in his directorial debut. It stars Turturro alongside Michael Badalucco, Katherine Borowitz, Carl Capotorto, Nicholas Turturro and Ellen Barkin. It won the Caméra d'Or award at the 1992 Cannes Film Festival and was nominated for an Independent Spirit Award.

Synopsis

Niccolo (Mac) Vitelli is the oldest of three brothers and becomes the de facto head of their family after their father dies. Their father was in construction and the brothers follow in his footsteps. At first, they work for Polowski, who cuts corners and does not do an adequate job, as well as being verbally abusive to his employees with no pride in his work. This causes them to start their own company - Vitelli Brothers Construction, which will be the opposite of Polowski. Mac starts becoming a tyrannical workaholic with obsessive concern about the quality of their work with worrying attention to detail. His intensity and driven ambition pushes his brothers away and breaks the family apart.

Main cast
 John Turturro as Niccolo "Mac" Vitelli
James Madio as Young Niccolo "Mac" Vitelli
 Michael Badalucco as Vico Vitelli
 Katherine Borowitz as Alice Stunder
 Carl Capotorto as Bruno Vitelli 
 Nicholas Turturro as Tony Gloves
 Matthew Sussman as Clarence
 Ellen Barkin as Oona Goldfarb
 Dennis Farina as Mr. Stunder
 Olek Krupa as Polowski
 Steven Randazzo as Gus
 Mike Starr as Firefighter
 Joe Paparone as Papa
 Aida Turturro as Wife
 Mario Todisco as Joe "The Mule" 
 Harry Bugin as Patient
 Michael Imperioli

References

External links
 
 

1992 drama films
1992 films
1990s English-language films
Drama films based on actual events
Films set in New York City
Films shot in New York City
American independent films
1990s Italian-language films
Polish-language films
Films directed by John Turturro
The Samuel Goldwyn Company films
Caméra d'Or winners
1992 directorial debut films
1992 independent films
1990s American films